The 1975 Kvalserien was the first edition of the Kvalserien. It determined which two teams of the participating ones would play in the 1975–76 Elitserien season and which six teams would play in the 1975–76 Swedish Division 1 season.

Tournament

Northeastern Group

Southwestern Group

External links
Tournament on hockeyarchives.info

Kvalserien
Kval